Alexandros Kouros (born 21 August 1993) is a Greek professional footballer of Albanian descent who plays as a left back for Albanian club Teuta Durrës.

References

External links
Insports profile 
Onsports.gr profile 

1993 births
Living people
Association football defenders
Greek footballers
Greece youth international footballers
Greece under-21 international footballers
Panionios F.C. players
Atromitos F.C. players
Iraklis Thessaloniki F.C. players
Apollon Smyrnis F.C. players
KF Teuta Durrës players
Super League Greece players
Kategoria Superiore players
Greek expatriate footballers
Greek expatriate sportspeople in Albania
Expatriate footballers in Albania
People from Poliçan